A constitutional referendum was held in Morocco on 1 March 1972. The new constitution replaced that approved by referendum in 1970, and was drawn up after an attempted coup in July 1971 forced King Hassan II to accept the need for a broader government (the previous constitution had limited directly elected seats to only 90 of the 240 in Parliament).

The constitution was approved by 98.8% of voters with a 93% turnout, and was promulgated on 10 March. Elections were scheduled for May. However, they were then indefinitely postponed, and did not take place until 1977.

Results

References

1972 referendums
1972
1972 in Morocco
Constitutional referendums in Morocco